The Men's Freestyle 61 kg is a competition featured at the 2020 European Wrestling Championships, and was held in Rome, Italy on February 15 and February 16.

Medalists

Results 
 Legend
 F — Won by fall

Main Bracket

Repechage

References

External links
Bracket

Men's Freestyle 61 kg